Indravati National Park is a national park located in Bijapur district of Chhattisgarh state in India. The park derives its name from the Indravati River, which flows from east to west and forms the northern boundary of the reserve with the Indian state of Maharashtra.

Indravati National Park is among the most famous wildlife parks of Chhattisgarh. It is one of three Project Tiger sites in Chhattisgarh, along with Udanti-sitanadi, and is home to one of the last remaining populations of the endangered wild water buffalo. With a total area of approximately 2799.08 km2, Indravati attained the status of a national park in 1981 and a tiger reserve in 1983, becoming one of the most famous tiger reserves in India.

As of 2022, the park is reported to be largely under Naxal control.

Topography
The topography of the park mainly comprises undulating hilly terrain with altitude ranging between 177 and 599 metres above the sea level.

Flora
The vegetation of the Indravati National Park is mainly of the tropical moist and dry deciduous type with predominance of bamboo, sal and teak. There are also patches of grassland providing food to large herbivores such as wild water buffalos, chital, barking deer, nilgai, and gaurs. The most common tree in the park are teak, lendia, salai, mahua, tendu, semal, haldu, ber and jamun.

Wildlife
Indravati National Park has one of the last populations of the endangered wild Asian buffalo. The national park is also home to a variety of other ungulate species. Reported from the area are Asian Elephant, gaur (Indian bison), nilgai, blackbuck, chausingha (four-horned antelope), sambar, chital, Indian muntjac, Indian spotted chevrotain and wild boar. Large predators are represented by tigers, leopards, sloth bears, and dholes (wild dogs). Smaller mammals include flying squirrel, porcupine, pangolins, rhesus monkeys and langurs among many others. The commonly found reptiles in the park are freshwater crocodile, monitor lizard, Indian chameleon, common krait, Indian rock python, cobra and Russell's viper to name a few. The park also gives shelter to the large variety of birds of which the hill myna is the most important species.

Transport
Indravati National Park is easily approachable from Jagdalpur, the district headquarters of Bastar. The village Kutrue, the main entry point of the park, is situated at the distance of 22.4 km north of Jagdalpur-Bhopalpattanam road. The Kutrue link road is at the distance of 145.6 km from Jagdalpur. Raipur (486 km) has the nearest airport and Jagdalpur (168 km) is the nearest railhead from the Indravati National Park.

Visiting
The recommended season to visit the park is from 15 December to 15 June.

See also

 National parks of India
 Kanger Ghati National Park
 Jagdalpur
 Danteshwari Temple
 Indian Council of Forestry Research and Education
 Tourism in Chhattisgarh
 Tamda Ghumar
 Chitrakote Falls
 Kotumsar Cave
 Mendri Ghumar

References

Eastern Highlands moist deciduous forests
Protected areas of Chhattisgarh
National parks in Chhattisgarh
Protected areas established in 1975
1975 establishments in Madhya Pradesh